Dergachi may refer to:
Derhachi, a town in Kharkiv Oblast, Ukraine
Dergachi, Russia, name of several inhabited localities in Russia